An abstract family of acceptors (AFA) is a grouping of generalized acceptors. Informally, an acceptor is a device with a finite state control, a finite number of input symbols, and an internal store with a read and write function. Each acceptor has a start state and a set of accepting states. The device reads a sequence of symbols, transitioning from state to state for each input symbol. If the device ends in an accepting state, the device is said to accept the sequence of symbols. A family of acceptors is a set of acceptors with the same type of internal store. The study of AFA is part of AFL (abstract families of languages) theory.

Formal definitions

AFA Schema
An AFA Schema is an ordered 4-tuple , where
  is the write function:  (N.B. * is the Kleene star operation).
(N.B.  is the empty word).

Abstract family of acceptors
An abstract family of acceptors (AFA) is an ordered pair  such that:
 is an ordered 6-tuple, where
 is an AFA schema; and
 is the family of all acceptors  =, where

Define  to be the set .

Define  to be the set .

Informal discussion

AFA Schema
An AFA schema defines a store or memory with read and write function. The write function  returns a new storage state given the current storage state and an instruction. The read function  returns the current state of memory. Condition (3) insures the empty storage configuration is distinct from other configurations. Condition (4)  requires there be an identity instruction that allows the state of memory to remain unchanged while the acceptor changes state or advances the input. Condition (5) assures that the set of storage symbols for any given acceptor is finite.

Abstract family of acceptors
An AFA is the set of all acceptors over a given pair of state and input alphabets which have the same storage mechanism defined by a given AFA schema. The  relation defines one step in the operation of an acceptor.   is the set of words accepted by acceptor  by having the acceptor enter an accepting state.  is the set of words accepted by acceptor  by having the acceptor simultaneously enter an accepting state and having an empty storage.

The abstract acceptors defined by AFA are generalizations of other types of acceptors (e.g. finite state automata, pushdown automata, etc.). They have a finite state control like other automata, but their internal storage may vary widely from the stacks and tapes used in classical automata.

Results from AFL theory
The main result from AFL theory is that a family of languages  is a full AFL if and only if  for some AFA .  Equally important is the result that  is a full semi-AFL if and only if  for some AFA .

Origins

Seymour Ginsburg of the University of Southern California and Sheila Greibach of Harvard University first presented their AFL theory paper at the IEEE Eighth Annual Symposium on Switching and Automata Theory in 1967.

References

Formal languages
Applied mathematics